Elections to the Goa, Daman and Diu Legislative Assembly were held in December 1984, to elect members of the 60 constituencies in Goa, Daman and Diu, India. The Indian National Congress won the most seats as well as the popular vote, and Pratapsingh Rane was re-appointed as the Chief Minister of Goa, Daman and Diu.

After the passing of the Delimitation of Parliamentary and Assembly Constituencies Order, 1976 by the Delimitation Commission of India, the legislative assembly had 30 constituencies. Halfway through the term, on 30 May 1987, the union territory was split, and Goa was made India's twenty-fifth state, with Daman and Diu remaining a union territory.

Result

Elected Members

Later events
In May 1987, the Government of India split the union territory of Goa, Daman and Diu into the new state of Goa and the union territory of Daman and Diu by The Constitution (Fifty-sixth Amendment) Act, 1987. The new Goa Legislative Assembly was assigned 40 seats from the next election, in 1989.

See also 
 List of constituencies of the Goa Legislative Assembly
 1984 elections in India

References

Goa, Daman and Diu
1984
1984